Oleksandr Syromiatnykov (born on July 12, 1994, in Ukraine) is a Ukrainian sprint canoer. He is a silver medalist of the 2019 European Games.

References

Ukrainian male canoeists
Living people
1994 births
Canoeists at the 2019 European Games
European Games medalists in canoeing
European Games silver medalists for Ukraine
21st-century Ukrainian people